Seven and a Match is a 2001 independent film directed and written by Derek Simonds. It was released in the United States on April 21, 2003.

Cast
Eion Bailey as Sid
Heather Donahue as Wit
Devon Gummersall as Matthew
Tina Holmes as Ellie
Adam Scott as Peter
Daniel Sauli as Tim
Petra Wright as Blair

Plot
Unemployed Ellie has invited a group of her ex-Yale University friends over to her dead parents' house to help her burn the house down for insurance money. This causes the group to explore their own feelings.

References

External links
 

American independent films
2001 films
2001 comedy-drama films
American comedy-drama films
2001 independent films
2000s English-language films
2000s American films